Roller Champions is a free-to-play sports video game developed by Ubisoft Montreal and published by Ubisoft. It was released on May 25, 2022 for Microsoft Windows, PlayStation 4 and Xbox One, and for Nintendo Switch on June 21, 2022.

Gameplay
Roller Champions is a 3v3 competitive multiplayer sports game played from a third-person perspective. The game starts off with the ball being dropped from the top of one of the four pillars around the arena, to indicate which pillar it is falling from there is a light flashing on it. After the ball has been dropped, players can grab the ball and start rolling it around the track to unlock the net. To unlock the net, the team must put the ball through all 4 gates, which are indicated by a faint light and are also parallel to the pillars, without the other team grabbing the ball and changing possession (it is not required to hold the ball while going through the gates). If the other team grabs the ball, all the gates are reset, and the team has to go through the same gates again. If the team goes through all 4 gates without the other team intercepting, then the net will be unlocked and the team can shoot into it to score points. If the team doesn't score after going through the first lap and goes through all 4 gates once again without being intercepted, the number of points the team scores changes to 3, and if the team does it once again, it becomes 5 points. To win the game, the team must either score 5 points before the other team or score more points than the other team before the timer of 7 minutes runs out. After playing a match, the user gains “fans” that can be used to advance through the roller pass tiers to gain cosmetic items and unlock new arenas.

Moves 
All this information can be found in-game under the “Moves & Rules” settings tab.

Development
Ubisoft officially announced the game during their press conference at E3 2019. A pre-alpha demo was available via Uplay from June 10 to June 14.

In a developer stream, Ubisoft confirmed that the game is in development for Microsoft Windows, Nintendo Switch, PlayStation 4, and Xbox One and mobile devices as well. The game was stated to be set for originally release in early 2021, though it was subsequently delayed to May 25, 2022 for Windows, PlayStation 4, and Xbox One, with the Nintendo Switch version being delayed to June 21, 2022.

Reception 

Roller Champions received "mixed or average" reviews, according to review aggregator Metacritic.

Ozzie Mejia of Shacknews gave Roller Champions a 7 out of 10 and praised the accessible core experience, crossplay, fast-paced sessions, arena design, and spectator options while criticizing the lack of character customization options, game modes, interesting character models, and long-term engaging gameplay. Jordan Ramée of GameSpot thought positively of the approachable movement mechanics, sense of speed, and incentive to progress, but felt that the skill ceiling was short, the matches were repetitive, and that the multiplayer communication features were lacking.

References

External links
 

2022 video games
Free-to-play video games
Multiplayer online games
Nintendo Switch games
PlayStation 4 games
Roller skating video games
Ubisoft games
Video games developed in Canada
Windows games
Xbox One games